Synergy School Radio is a digital integrated radio studio.
Radio is a growing tool within education and is regularly cited for good practice and innovation.
School Radio projects have often received significant support from government and education consultants a like advocating the use of School Radio projects as part of good practice.

Synergy were behind the Determined to Broadcast bus. The bus received both support and sponsorship from Synergy but it was also Synergy radio studios that made up the core of the technology being used. The Synergy School Radio project received high-profile support from  Radio Clyde's Ross King (presenter) and Gina McKie, XFM Scotland's Heather Suttie and GMTV presenter Jenni Falconer.

Synergy School Radio are associated sponsors of the Sony Award category "Best School Radio station".

In September 2018 the brand was purchased by Clyde Broadcast Technology Limited.

Education sites using Synergy
 Ashmole School
 saltash.net
 University of Derby
 Blackpool College
 Glasgow Caledonian University
 St. Thomas Aquinas Secondary School, Jordanhill
 Robert Gordon University
 Pulse FM
 Archbishop Ilsley Catholic School
 Cardinal Wiseman Catholic School, Birmingham
 Westminster Academy (London)
 Reid Kerr College
 West Exe Technology College

References

External links
 
 Clydebroadcast

Education in Scotland
 Synergy
Educational broadcasting in the United Kingdom
British inventions
Education in England